La Parade Monstrueuse is In Strict Confidence's seventh studio album.

Track listing

EPs
 My Despair
 Silver Bullets
 Set Me Free

References

2010 albums
In Strict Confidence albums